The Forger is a 1927 crime novel by the British writer Edgar Wallace.

Film adaptations
 In 1928 a British silent film The Forger was made, based on the novel.
In 1961 the book served as the inspiration for the German film The Forger of London, part of a long-running series of Wallace adaptations.

References

Bibliography
 Bergfelder, Tim. International Adventures: German Popular Cinema and European Co-Productions in the 1960s. Berghahn Books, 2005.

External links
 

1927 British novels
British novels adapted into films
Novels by Edgar Wallace
Novels set in London
Works about money forgery
Hodder & Stoughton books